Ílton Vaccari (born 25 October 1934) is a Brazilian footballer. He played in nine matches for the Brazil national football team from 1956 to 1963. He was also part of Brazil's squad for the 1963 South American Championship.

References

External links
 

1934 births
Living people
Brazilian footballers
Brazil international footballers
Association football midfielders
Footballers from Rio de Janeiro (city)